José Ignacio Landaluce Calleja (born February 1, 1959) is a Spanish politician and surgeon who has been a member of the Congress of Deputies, representing Cadiz Province between 1996 and 2000 and since 2008, and is the current mayor of Algeciras.

References

1959 births
Living people
Mayors of places in Andalusia
Members of the 6th Congress of Deputies (Spain)
Members of the 9th Congress of Deputies (Spain)
Members of the 10th Congress of Deputies (Spain)
Members of the 14th Senate of Spain
People from Algeciras
Spanish surgeons